This Champagne Mojito Is The Last Thing I Own is a 2008 novel by Irish journalist and author Paul Howard, and the seventh in the Ross O'Carroll-Kelly series. It coincided with the beginning of the Post-2008 Irish economic downturn and the release of the first play about Ross, The Last Days of the Celtic Tiger.

Title
The title is a reference to Jonathan Rendall's novel This Bloody Mary (Is the Last Thing I Own). A champagne Mojito is a cocktail made with spearmint, rum, sugar, lime and champagne, which Ross purchases with his last €20.

Plot

Ross's father Charles is imprisoned, Ross is forced to work for a living as the economic crash coincides with his father's downfall, and his wife Sorcha leaves him.

Reception
The book was a bestseller.

This Champagne Mojito Is The Last Thing I Own was nominated for the Popular Fiction award at the Irish Book Awards.

References

2008 Irish novels
Penguin Books books
Ross O'Carroll-Kelly
Fiction set in 2006
Fiction set in 2007